De Freitas or DeFreitas may refer to:

People 
 Afonso Cláudio de Freitas Rosa (1859–1934), the first governor of the Brazilian state of Espirito Santo
 Alcindo Martha de Freitas (born 1945), a Brazilian football player
 Alexandre Edílson de Freitas (born 1976), a Brazilian football player
 Alfeu Martha de Freitas (born 1936), a Brazilian football player
 Alfredo Eduardo Barreto de Freitas Noronha (1918–2003), a Brazilian football player
 António A. de Freitas (born 1947), a Portuguese immunologist
 Augusto Teixeira de Freitas (1816–1883), a Brazilian jurist
 Bront DeFreitas (born 1978), British Virgin Islands cricketer
 Chris de Freitas, Associate Professor in the School of Environment at the University of Auckland in New Zealand
 Christophe Freitas (born 1981), a French football player
 Claudio Luiz Assuncao de Freitas (born 1972), a Brazilian football player
 Cyro de Freitas Valle (1896–1969), a Brazilian diplomat
 Danilo Alves de Freitas (born 1989), a Brazilian football player
 David de Freitas (Brazilian footballer) (born 1986), Brazilian football player
 David de Freitas (French footballer) (born 1979), French football player
 Edevaldo de Freitas (born 1958), a Brazilian football player
 Eleanor de Freitas (1990–2014)
 Elvis Defreitas (born 1981), Barbadian footballer
 Fabian de Freitas (born 1972), a Surinamese football player
 Fabiano Ribeiro de Freitas (born 1988), a Brazilian football player
 Fernanda de Freitas (born 1980), a Brazilian actress
 Frank DeFreitas (born 1956), American holographer
 Frederico de Freitas (1902–1980), a Portuguese composer, conductor and musicologist
 Gastão de Freitas Ferraz (World War II period), a Portuguese spy working for the Abwehr
 Geoffrey de Freitas (1913–1982), a British politician and diplomat
 Heleno de Freitas (1920–1959), a Brazilian football player
 João Bosco de Freitas Chaves (born 1974), a Brazilian football player
 João Bosco Gualberto de Freitas (born 1974), a Brazilian football player
 Jordan de Freitas (born 1966), a Brazilian football manager
 Jorge de Freitas Antunes (born 1942), a Brazilian composer
 José de Freitas Ribeiro (1868–1929), an official of the Portuguese Navy and a politician
 Jose Pedro de Freitas (1921–1971), a Brazilian self-proclaimed psychic surgeon
 José Ramalho Carvalho de Freitas (born 1980), a Brazilian football player
 José Vicente de Freitas (1869–1952), a Portuguese military officer and politician
 Jurandir de Freitas (1940–1996), a Brazilian football player
 Kevin De Freitas (living), a Canadian music video director
 Kléber de Souza Freitas (born 1983), a Brazilian football player
 Lançarote de Freitas (15th century), a Portuguese explorer and slave trader
 Lima de Freitas (1927–1998), a Portuguese painter, illustrator, ceramicist and writer
 Luís de Freitas Branco (1890–1955), a Portuguese composer and musicologist
 Manuel de Freitas (born 1968), a South African politician
 Márcio Rezende de Freitas (born 1960), a Brazilian football referee
 Maycon Vieira de Freitas (born 1985), a Brazilian football player
 Michael de Freitas (1933–1975), a Trinidad and Tobago civil rights activist
 Nando de Freitas, researching in machine learning and deep learning at Oxford University
 Bebeto de Freitas (born 1950), a Brazilian volleyball coach and football manager
 Pete de Freitas (1961–1989), a musician and producer, best known as a drummer with Echo & the Bunnymen
 Phillip DeFreitas (born 1966), an English cricketer
 Ramon Lopes de Freitas (born 1989), a Brazilian football player
 Ramón Rodrigo de Freitas (born 1983), a Brazilian football player
 Ricardo de Freitas Carreira (born 1978), a former Brazilian football player
 Ronaldo Rogério de Freitas Mourão (born 1935), a Brazilian astronomer
 Ronildo Pereira de Freitas (born 1977), a Brazilian football player
 Ruy de Freitas (1916–2012), a Brazilian basketball player
 Scott DeFreitas (born 1969), American actor
 Sebastião de Freitas Branco de Herédia (1903–1983), a Portuguese fencer and modern pentathlete
 Sebastião de Freita Couto Júnior (born 1992), a Brazilian football player
 Uladislau Herculano de Freitas (1865–1926), a Brazilian politician
 Vítor Tiago de Freitas Fernandes (born 1986), a Portuguese football player

Places 
 José de Freitas, a municipality in the state of Piauí, Brazil
 Rodrigo de Freitas Lagoon (Lagoa Rodrigo de Freitas), a lagoon and district in the Lagoa, Zona Sul region of Rio de Janeiro, Brazil
 Lauro de Freitas, a municipality in the north-east of the state of Bahia, Brazil
 Teixeira de Freitas, a city in the extreme south of the state of Bahia, Brazil

See also 
 Freitas (disambiguation)
 De Freitas do Amaral (disambiguation)